Paidichintalapally is a small village in Dharmaram Mandal, Karimnagar district of Andhra Pradesh, India.

Villages in Karimnagar district